Ioan Nicholas (born 3 April 1998) is a Welsh rugby union player who plays for Scarlets and Llanelli as a centre.

Nicholas made his debut for the Scarlets as a 17 year old in a friendly against Jersey in 2015, and he scored a try in every game since. He played a part in the remaining two friendlies of the 2015-16 season before making his competitive debut against Ulster as a substitute.

References

External links 
Scarlets Player Profile

1998 births
Living people
Rugby union players from Carmarthenshire
Scarlets players
Welsh rugby union players
Rugby union centres
Rugby union wings